Giulio Maculani (7 August 1920 – 21 November 1980) was an Italian actor, stunt actor and assistant director.

She appeared in Il Leone di San Marco (1963), directed by Luigi Capuano. and in western films such as Un poker di pistole (1967), directed by Joseph Warren, and Sette winchester per un massacro, directed by Enzo G. Castellari.

She also appeared in Hercules, Prisoner of Evil (1964), directed by Antonio Margheriti; Hercules the Avenger (1965), directed by Maurizio Lucidi; Revenge of the Barbarians (1960), directed by Giuseppe Vari; and War of the Zombies (1964).

She played Spanish Patrol Captain in L'avventuriero della tortuga (1964), and Giulio in The Black Duke (1963),

Partial filmography

References

Bibliography

External links
 

1920 births
1980 deaths
20th-century Italian male actors
Italian male television actors
Italian male film actors
Italian stunt performers
People of Lazian descent